"Night Lights" is a 1956 song by written by Sammy Gallop and Chester Conn, recorded by Nat King Cole, and released as a single on the Capitol Records label. The song reached number 17 on the Best Sellers in Stores chart in Billboard Magazine. It was ranked as one of the top songs of the year by Billboard in 1956. The B-side, "To the Ends of the Earth", was written by the Sherman Brothers.

Charts

References 

Nat King Cole songs
1956 songs
1956 singles
Songs with lyrics by Sammy Gallop
Songs written by Chester Conn
Capitol Records singles